Comte Henri Marie Raymond de Toulouse-Lautrec-Monfa (24 November 1864 – 9 September 1901) was a French painter, printmaker, draughtsman, caricaturist and illustrator whose immersion in the colourful and theatrical life of Paris in the late 19th century allowed him to produce a collection of enticing, elegant, and provocative images of the sometimes decadent affairs of those times.

Born into the aristocracy, Toulouse-Lautrec broke both his legs around the time of his adolescence and, due to the rare condition Pycnodysostosis, was very short as an adult due to his undersized legs. In addition to his alcoholism, he developed an affinity for brothels and prostitutes that directed the subject matter for many of his works recording many details of the late-19th-century bohemian lifestyle in Paris. Toulouse-Lautrec is among the painters described as being Post-Impressionists, with Paul Cézanne, Vincent van Gogh, Paul Gauguin, and Georges Seurat also commonly considered as belonging in this loose group.

In a 2005 auction at Christie's auction house, La Blanchisseuse, his early painting of a young laundress, sold for US$22.4 million, setting a new record for the artist for a price at auction.

Early life
Henri Marie Raymond de Toulouse-Lautrec-Monfa was born at the Hôtel du Bosc in Albi, Tarn, in the Midi-Pyrénées region of France, the firstborn child of Alphonse Charles Comte de Toulouse-Lautrec-Monfa (1838–1913) and his wife Adèle Zoë Tapié de Celeyran (1841–1930). He was a member of an aristocratic family (descended from both the Counts of Toulouse and Odet de Foix, Vicomte de Lautrec and the Viscounts of Montfa, in southern France). His younger brother was born in 1867 but died the following year. Both sons enjoyed the titres de courtoisie of Comte. If Henri had outlived his father, he would have been accorded the family title of Comte de Toulouse-Lautrec.

After the death of his brother, Toulouse-Lautrec's parents separated and a nanny eventually took care of him. At the age of eight, Toulouse-Lautrec began living with his mother in Paris, where he drew sketches and caricatures in his exercise workbooks. The family quickly realised that his talents lay in drawing and painting. A friend of his father, René Princeteau, sometimes visited to give informal lessons. Some of Toulouse-Lautrec's early paintings are of horses, a speciality of Princeteau, and a subject Lautrec revisited in his "Circus Paintings".

In 1875, Toulouse-Lautrec returned to Albi because his mother had concerns about his health. He took thermal baths at Amélie-les-Bains, and his mother consulted doctors in the hope of finding a way to improve her son's growth and development.

Disability and health problems

Toulouse-Lautrec's parents were first cousins (his grandmothers were sisters), and his congenital health conditions were attributed to a family history of inbreeding.

At the age of 13, Toulouse-Lautrec fractured his right femur, and at 14, he fractured his left femur. The breaks did not heal properly. Modern physicians attribute this to an unknown genetic disorder, possibly pycnodysostosis (sometimes known as Toulouse-Lautrec Syndrome), or a variant disorder along the lines of osteopetrosis, achondroplasia, or osteogenesis imperfecta. Rickets aggravated by praecox virilism has also been suggested. He developed an adult-sized torso while retaining his child-sized legs. Additionally, he is reported to have had hypertrophied genitals.

Physically unable to participate in many activities enjoyed by boys his age, Toulouse-Lautrec immersed himself in art. After initially failing college entrance exams, he passed his second attempt and completed his studies.

Paris

During a stay in Nice, France, his progress in painting and drawing impressed Princeteau, who persuaded Toulouse-Lautrec's parents to allow him return to Paris and study under the portrait painter Léon Bonnat. He returned to Paris in 1882. Toulouse-Lautrec's mother had high ambitions and, with the aim of her son becoming a fashionable and respected painter, used their family's influence to gain him entry to Bonnat's studio. He was drawn to Montmartre, the area of Paris known for its bohemian lifestyle and the haunt of artists, writers, and philosophers. Studying with Bonnat placed Toulouse-Lautrec in the heart of Montmartre, an area he rarely left over the next 20 years.

After Bonnat took a new job, Toulouse-Lautrec moved to the studio of Fernand Cormon in 1882 and studied for a further five years and established the group of friends he kept for the rest of his life. At this time, he met Émile Bernard and Vincent van Gogh. Cormon, whose instruction was more relaxed than Bonnat's, allowed his pupils to roam Paris, looking for subjects to paint. During this period, Toulouse-Lautrec had his first encounter with a prostitute (reputedly sponsored by his friends), which led him to paint his first painting of a prostitute in Montmartre, a woman rumoured to be Marie-Charlet.

Early career 
In 1885, Toulouse-Lautrec began to exhibit his work at the cabaret of Aristide Bruant's Mirliton.

With his studies finished, in 1887, he participated in an exposition in Toulouse using the pseudonym "Tréclau", the verlan of the family name "Lautrec". He later exhibited in Paris with Van Gogh and Louis Anquetin.

In 1885, Toulouse-Lautrec met Suzanne Valadon. He made several portraits of her and supported her ambition as an artist. It is believed that they were lovers and that she wanted to marry him. Their relationship ended, and Valadon attempted suicide in 1888.

Rise to recognition 
In 1888, the Belgian critic Octave Maus invited him to present eleven pieces at the Vingt (the 'Twenties') exhibition in Brussels in February. Theo van Gogh, the artist's brother, bought Poudre de Riz (Rice Powder) for 150 francs for the Goupil & Cie gallery.

From 1889 until 1894, Toulouse-Lautrec took part in the Salon des Indépendants regularly. He made several landscapes of Montmartre. Tucked deep into Montmartre in the garden of Monsieur Pere Foret, Toulouse-Lautrec executed a series of pleasant en plein air paintings of Carmen Gaudin, the same red-headed model who appears in The Laundress (1888).

In 1890, during the banquet of the XX exhibition in Brussels, he challenged to a duel the artist Henri de Groux who criticised van Gogh's works. Paul Signac also declared he would continue to fight for Van Gogh's honour if Lautrec was killed. De Groux apologised for the slight and left the group and the duel never took place.

Toulouse-Lautrec contributed several illustrations to the magazine Le Rire during the mid-1890s.

Interactions with women 
In addition to his growing alcoholism, Toulouse-Lautrec also visited prostitutes. He was fascinated by their lifestyle and the lifestyle of the "urban underclass" and incorporated those characters into his paintings. Fellow painter Édouard Vuillard later said that while Toulouse-Lautrec did engage in sex with prostitutes, "the real reasons for his behaviour were moral ones ... Lautrec was too proud to submit to his lot, as a physical freak, an aristocrat cut off from his kind by his grotesque appearance. He found an affinity between his condition and the moral penury of the prostitute."

The girls in the brothels inspired Toulouse-Lautrec. He would frequently visit one located in Rue d'Amboise, where he had a favourite called Mireille. He created about a hundred drawings and fifty paintings inspired by the life of these women. In 1892 and 1893, he created a series of two women kissing called Le Lit, and in 1894 painted Salón de la Rue des Moulins from memory in his studio.

He declared, "A model is always a stuffed doll, but these women are alive. I wouldn't venture to pay them the hundred sous to sit for me, and god knows whether they would be worth it. They stretch out on the sofas like animals, make no demand and they are not in the least bit conceited." He was well appreciated by the ladies, saying, "I have found girls of my own size! Nowhere else do I feel so much at home".

The Moulin Rouge 
When the Moulin Rouge cabaret opened in 1889, Toulouse-Lautrec was commissioned to produce a series of posters. His mother had left Paris and, though he had a regular income from his family, making posters offered him a living of his own. Other artists looked down on the work, but he ignored them. The cabaret reserved a seat for him and displayed his paintings. Among the works that he painted for the Moulin Rouge and other Parisian nightclubs are depictions of the singer Yvette Guilbert; the dancer Louise Weber, better known as La Goulue (The Glutton) who created the French can-can; and the much subtler dancer Jane Avril.

London

Toulouse-Lautrec's family was Anglophilic, and though he was not as fluent as he pretended to be, he spoke English well enough. He travelled to London, where he was commissioned by the J. & E. Bella company to make a poster advertising their paper confetti (plaster confetti was banned after the 1892 Mardi Gras) and the bicycle advert La Chaîne Simpson.

While in London, he met and befriended Oscar Wilde. When Wilde faced imprisonment in Britain, Toulouse-Lautrec became a very vocal supporter of him, and his portrait of Oscar Wilde was painted the same year as Wilde's trial.

Alcoholism

Toulouse-Lautrec was mocked for his short stature and physical appearance, which may have contributed to his abuse of alcohol.

He initially drank only beer and wine, but his tastes expanded into liquor, namely absinthe. The "Earthquake Cocktail" (Tremblement de Terre) is attributed to Toulouse-Lautrec: a potent mixture containing half absinthe and half cognac in a wine goblet. Due to his underdeveloped legs, he walked with the aid of a cane, which he hollowed out and kept filled with liquor in order to ensure that he was never without alcohol.

Cooking skills
A fine and hospitable cook, Toulouse-Lautrec built up a collection of favourite recipes – some original, some adapted – which were posthumously published by his friend and dealer Maurice Joyant as L'Art de la Cuisine. The book was republished in English translation in 1966 as The Art of Cuisine – a tribute to his inventive (and wide-ranging) cooking.

Death

By February 1899, Toulouse-Lautrec's alcoholism began to take its toll and he collapsed from exhaustion. His family had him committed to Folie Saint-James, a sanatorium in Neuilly-sur-Seine for three months. While he was committed, he drew 39 circus portraits. After his release, he returned to the Paris studio for a time and then travelled throughout France. His physical and mental health began to decline rapidly owing to alcoholism and syphilis, which he reportedly contracted from Rosa La Rouge, a prostitute who was the subject of several of his paintings.

On Monday 9 September 1901, at the age of 36, he died from complications due to alcoholism and syphilis at his mother's estate, Château Malromé, in Saint-André-du-Bois. He is buried in Cimetière de Verdelais, Gironde, a few kilometres from the estate. His last words reportedly were "Le vieux con!" ("The old fool!"), his goodbye to his father, though another version has been suggested, in which he used the word "hallali", a term used by huntsmen at the moment the hounds kill their prey: "Je savais, Papa, que vous ne manqueriez pas l'hallali." ("I knew, papa, that you wouldn't miss the death.")

After Toulouse-Lautrec's death, his mother, Adèle Comtesse de Toulouse-Lautrec-Monfa, and his art dealer, Maurice Joyant, continued promoting his artwork. His mother contributed funds for a museum to be created in Albi, his birthplace, to show his works. This Musée Toulouse-Lautrec owns the most extensive collection of his works.

Art

In a career of less than 20 years, Toulouse-Lautrec created:
 737 canvassed paintings
 275 watercolours
 363 prints and posters
 5,084 drawings
 some ceramic and stained-glass work
 an unknown number of lost works
His debt to the Impressionists, particularly the more figurative painters like Manet and Degas, is apparent, that within his works, one can draw parallels to the detached barmaid at A Bar at the Folies-Bergère by Manet and the behind-the-scenes ballet dancers of Degas. His style was also influenced by the classical Japanese woodprints, which became popular in art circles in Paris.

He excelled at depicting people in their working environments, with the colour and movement of the gaudy nightlife present but the glamour stripped away. He was a master at painting crowd scenes where each figure was highly individualised. At the time they were painted, the individual figures in his larger paintings could be identified by silhouette alone, and the names of many of these characters have been recorded. His treatment of his subject matter, whether as portraits, in scenes of Parisian nightlife, or as intimate studies, has been described as alternately "sympathetic" and "dispassionate".

Toulouse-Lautrec's skilled depiction of people relied on his highly linear approach emphasising contours. He often applied paint in long, thin brushstrokes leaving much of the board visible. Many of his works may be best described as "drawings in coloured paint."

On 20 August 2018, Toulouse-Lautrec was the featured artist on the BBC television program Fake or Fortune?. Researchers attempted to discover whether he created two discovered sketchbooks.

In popular culture

Films
Moulin Rouge (1952): A film about the artist, portrayed by José Ferrer 
Casino Royale (1967): Evelyn Tremble (Peter Sellers) dresses as Toulouse-Lautrec for Vesper Lynde (Ursula Andress)
The Aristocats (1970): In this animated film, Toulouse, the oldest kitten, is voiced by Gary Dubin
Revenge of the Pink Panther (1978): Inspector Clouseau (Peter Sellers) disguises himself as Toulouse-Lautrec
Lautrec (1998): A French biographical film directed by Roger Planchon
Moulin Rouge! (2001): A musical film in which the artist is a supporting character,  portrayed by John Leguizamo
Midnight in Paris (2011): A fantasy involving time travel. He is a supporting character, portrayed by Vincent Menjou Cortes

Literature 
Sacré Bleu: A Comedy d'Art, by Christopher Moore, in which the bon vivant artist plays the role of co-detective with the fictional lead, Lucien Lessard, in trying to unravel the death of mutual friend Vincent van Gogh.
Lust for Life (1934), historical novel based on the life of Vincent van Gogh.
Moulin Rouge (novel), by Pierre La Mure (1950), historical novel based on the life of Henri de Toulouse-Lautrec.

Selected works
See also :Category:Paintings by Henri de Toulouse-Lautrec.

Paintings

Posters

Other

Photos of Toulouse-Lautrec

See also 
 Art Nouveau posters and graphic arts
 Salon des Cent
 Les Maîtres de l'Affiche

References

Further reading

 Frey, Julia (1994). Toulouse-Lautrec: A Life. Viking. 

 Sweetman, David (1999). Explosive Acts: Toulouse-Lautrec, Oscar Wilde, Félix Fénéon, and the Art & Anarchy of the Fin de Siecle. Simon & Schuster.

External links

 
Toulouse-Lautrec and Montmartre at the National Gallery of Art

Henri de Toulouse-Lautrec – Artcyclopedia
Young woman at a table, 'Poudre de riz', 1887 Henri de Toulouse-Lautrec Collection Van Gogh Museum
Toulouse Lautrec Museum
 Bibliothèque numérique de l'INHA - Estampes de Henri de Toulouse-Lautrec (French National Institute of Art – Prints of Henri de Toulouse-Lautrec) 
Toulouse-Lautrec and Jane Avril beyond the Moulin Rouge - Courtauld Gallery, London 

 
French male painters
Post-impressionist painters
1864 births
1901 deaths
Art Nouveau illustrators
Art Nouveau painters
French erotic artists
French illustrators
French poster artists
Counts of France
Artists with disabilities
French people with disabilities
Lycée Condorcet alumni
People from Albi
Alcohol-related deaths in France
Deaths from syphilis
Burials in Nouvelle-Aquitaine
19th-century French painters
19th-century French male artists
20th-century French painters
20th-century French male artists
20th-century French printmakers
People of Montmartre
Moulin Rouge